Grandview Cemetery is a cemetery in Fort Collins, Larimer County, Colorado.

The land for the cemetery was purchased in 1887; at the time it was west of the city limits of Fort Collins.  Mountain Home Cemetery had been used prior to this, but it was closer to town, and with the population of Fort Collins rapidly expanding it was deemed necessary to find another location farther from town.  The remains buried at Mountain Home were gradually transferred to Grandview beginning in late 1887 or early 1888 and by the 1920s the site of the former cemetery at Mountain Home had been converted to a playground.

The first interment at Grandview took place on November 21, 1887, when a three-month-old infant named Felix Scoville was buried there.

As of 2009 Grandview consisted of approximately  development, 34,000 grave spaces, 70 crypts, 336 niches, and over 22,000 burials.

Notable burials
 James B. Arthur (1831–1905), Colorado state senator
 Fred N. Cummings (1864–1952), American rancher and democrat
 Jean Bethke Elshtain (1941–2013), scholar of religion and political philosophy
 William Silas Hill (1886–1972), U.S. representative
 Henderson C. Howard (1839–1919), Union army soldier and Pennsylvania sheriff
 Mark D. Miller (1891–1970), American photographer
 Charles Bateman Timberlake (1851–1941), U.S representative

Notes

External links
 
 History of Fort Collins Cemeteries at Fort Collins City website
 Interment Index of Grandview and Roselawn Cemeteries (Note: For the Interment Index, click I Agree, then click on the Search by pull down box (defaults to Address), change to Cemetery Plot (Last Name) to search for interments by last name. If the Cemetery ID begins with a 'G' the burial was at Grandview, if it begins with an 'R' the burial was at Roselawn Cemetery, also in Fort Collins.)
 Finding the James B. Arthur monument at Grandview Cemetery

Cemeteries in Colorado
Geography of Fort Collins, Colorado
Protected areas of Larimer County, Colorado